Oak Park is a park and surrounding neighborhood in the Souris Valley in Minot, North Dakota.  The wooded park is over 50-acres in size.  In addition to the namesake oak trees, ash and elm trees are also commonly found in the park.  The Souris Valley Birding Club meets regularly at the park to watch hooded mergansers, wood ducks, Canada geese, kingfishers, Great blue herons, and other birds. The eastern edge of the park borders the Souris River, also called the Mouse River.  A small oxbow lake is also located in the park.  Oak Park has numerous walking/biking trails, both paved and unpaved; a splash pad; and volleyball court.  The park is home to concerts in the park run by the Minot Area Council of Arts, through their Arts in the Park program.  On Tuesdays, Thursdays, and Saturdays from July to October, a farmers market also operates out of Oak Park.  In 2011, the farmers market at the park was temporarily moved to the North Hill Soccer Complex because of the 2011 Souris River flood.   On August 4, 2010, a man was found dead in the park from an apparent suicide.   Oak Park was the winner of the 2011 America's Favorite Park Contest sponsored by Coca-Cola and is set to receive a $100,000 grant.

The Oak Park Theater sits across from Oak Park.  It is currently the only independent operating movie theater in the city of Minot.  The theater opened in 1961, but was closed in 1980.  It operated as a pool hall until 2000, when it was converted back to a theater specializing in second run films.  In 2011, the theater was damaged in the Souris River flood.

References

External links
Oak Park Theater
Minot Parks District

Parks in North Dakota
Protected areas of Ward County, North Dakota
Tourist attractions in Minot, North Dakota
Neighborhoods in Minot, North Dakota